Leslie Ernest Favell  (6 October 1929 – 14 June 1987) was an Australian cricketer who played in 19 Test matches between 1954 and 1961. South Australia's fourth highest run scorer, Favell was a much loved character and a daring batsman who liked to hit the ball around the ground.

Favell moved to South Australia in 1951—joining the East Torrens Cricket Club. He debuted for South Australia the same year—playing 121 games (1951-1970) and captaining 95 games including Sheffield Shield victories in 1963/64 and 1968/69. He made his Test debut against England in 1954-55 at Brisbane after making 84 and 47 against them for South Australia, but he failed in the series and was dropped. He is mentioned in Lord Kitchener's calypso single The Ashes (Australia vs MCC 1955): "Les Favell got going, his wicket went tumbling", referring to his 30, caught Cowdrey bowled Tyson, the first wicket of Tyson's seven in the 3rd Test at Melbourne.

He scored 12,379 runs in first-class cricket, the most by an Australian player who never toured England.

Favell was appointed a Member of the Order of the British Empire in the 1969 New Year Honours for service to cricket.

The Favell-Dansie Indoor Centre, Adelaide Oval's indoor cricket centre, is named after both Favell and his contemporary, Neil Dansie.

References

1929 births
1987 deaths
Australian Members of the Order of the British Empire
Australia Test cricketers
South Australia cricketers
Cricketers from Sydney
Sportsmen from New South Wales